Methodist Ladies' College (commonly referred to as MLC) is an independent, Uniting, non-selective, day and boarding school for girls, located in Kew, an eastern suburb of Melbourne, Victoria, Australia. The school has two additional outdoor education campuses known as "Marshmead" and "Banksia".

Established in 1882 on its current campus by the Methodist Church of Australasia, MLC caters for approximately 2200 students from the Early Learning Centre (MLC Kindle) to year 12, including more than 100 boarders.

The college is a member of Girls Sport Victoria, the Australian Boarding Schools' Association, the Junior School Heads Association of Australia (JSHAA), the Association of Heads of Independent Schools of Australia (AHISA), and the Alliance of Girls' Schools Australasia.

MLC offers students both the Victorian Certificate of Education and the International Baccalaureate.

Fees are up to $36,000 per student per year.

History
William Henry Fitchett was secretary of a committee formed in 1879 to start a secondary school for girls.
MLC was founded on its current campus in Kew on 14 February 1882 as a modern school of the first order, with buildings that formed a collegiate institution for girls unsurpassed in the colonies. It was the first Australian girls' school established by the Wesleyan Methodists and Fitchett was the first principal. The goal of its founders was to provide a high-class Christian education for girls, comparable with that provided elsewhere for boys. As the first Australian girls' school established by the Wesleyan Methodists, MLC attracted boarders from all Australian colonies.

In 1990, MLC became the first school in the world to introduce laptop computers for all students from Year 5 to Year 12. In 1991, MLC Marshmead opened, providing Year 9 students with an eight-week residential experience with a focus on outdoor education.

In 2001, The Sun-Herald reported a 1988 study which ranked MLC third in Australia's top ten girls' schools, based on the number of its alumni mentioned in the Who's Who in Australia (a listing of notable Australians). In 2002, MLC won the title of 'Australian School of the Year', as published in The Australian newspaper.

Principals 
There have been a total of nine principal or formerly headmaster’s of MLC since the school was founded in 1882.

House system
As with most Australian schools, MLC has a house system through which students partake in inter-house competitions and activities. The college currently has five houses:
Berry - Colour: Purple, Mascot: Turtle.
Cato - Colour: Blue, Mascot: Bear.
Fitchett - Colour: Yellow, Mascot: Lion
Krome - Colour: Green, Mascot: Frog
Nevile - Colour: Pink, Mascot: Pink Panther

In the past, there was a Tiddeman house (colour red), which was specifically for boarders.

Curriculum
MLC offers an extensive range of VCE and Vocational Education Training (VET) courses, as well as the IB Diploma Programme. It has one of the largest VCE subject selections in the state. The school's success with the IB Programme is internationally renowned, with students consistently achieving in the top global percentile each year.  Its physical education program includes a wide variety of summer and winter sports. It participates in the Girls Sport Victoria competition.

The music school features an auditorium, and a department for woodwind, strings, keyboard, percussion and brass, with multiple ensembles including a concert orchestra, senior strings, choirs and bands. The music school is known for its excellence. The state of the art auditorium is often used for external performances.

The school offers a speech and drama program from early years and theatre arts and drama at VCE level, as well as a variety of studio arts subjects.

Sport 
MLC is a member of Girls Sport Victoria (GSV).

GSV premierships 
MLC has won the following GSV premierships.

 Athletics - 2010
 Badminton (2) - 2011, 2016
 Basketball (6) - 2004, 2005, 2007, 2011, 2017, 2019
 Cricket (4) - 2008, 2010, 2015, 2017
 Diving (2) - 2001, 2002
 Football (8) - 2011, 2012, 2013, 2014, 2015, 2016, 2018, 2019
 Hockey (11) - 2001, 2004, 2009, 2010, 2012, 2013, 2015, 2016, 2017, 2018, 2019
 Indoor Cricket (2) - 2009, 2010
 Netball - 2002
 Soccer - 2005
 Softball (3) - 2001, 2008, 2009
 Swimming (18) - 2001, 2002, 2003, 2004, 2005, 2006, 2007, 2008, 2009, 2010, 2011, 2012, 2014, 2015, 2016, 2017, 2018, 2019
 Tennis (4) - 2005, 2006, 2010, 2018
 Volleyball (5) - 2012, 2013, 2014, 2015, 2019
 Water Polo (3) - 2016, 2017, 2018

Indigenous programmes
MLC works with the Yalari scholarship programme to support Indigenous girls from regional, rural and remote communities to study and board at MLC. Yalari is a not-for-profit organisation that offers secondary education scholarships at leading Australian boarding schools. MLC includes Indigenous issues in its mainstream curriculum, maintains a student Aboriginal Reconciliation Committee, grows an Indigenous garden, and appoints a senior Year 12 prefect to an Indigenous portfolio. MLC holds annual sporting and cultural exchanges with Worowa Aboriginal College at Healesville, Victoria.

Notable alumnae

Alumnae of the Methodist Ladies' College are known as 'Old Collegians' and automatically become members of the 'MLC Old Collegians' Club' upon graduation. The club was established on 29 October 1904 for the purpose of providing an ongoing relationship between the college and its alumnae.

Some notable "Old Collegians" include:

Entertainment, media and the arts
Alice Marian Ellen Bale –  artist
Katie Bender, filmmaker
Cate Blanchett, AC – Academy Award-winning actress, director, (also attended Ivanhoe Girls' Grammar School)
Zoe Caldwell, OBE – Tony Award-winning actress
Margaret Dredge, painter and printmaker
Roma Egan – child TV actress, ballet dancer and teacher
Ada Lorna Forbes – actress
Deborra-Lee Furness – actress
Marzena Godecki – actress
Libbi Gorr – entertainer (also once commonly known as "Elle McFeast" working as a comedian on the major media network the Australian Broadcasting Corporation)
Tessa James – actress
Nene King − magazine publisher, former editor and editor-in-chief of Women's Weekly and Woman's Day
Karen Knowles – singer, producer and director
Joyce Nicholson – author, political philanthropist
Yumi Stynes – television presenter (also attended Melbourne Girls' Grammar School)
Ilona von Feuchtersleben - Violinist Melbourne Symphony Orchestra
Dora Lynnell Wilson – artist
Elizabeth Wood-Ellem – editor and biographer

Medicine and science
Isabel Clifton Cookson – botanist and palaeobotanist
Mary Clementina De Garis – obstetrician, second woman in Victoria to take out a Doctorate of Medicine
Hilda Estelle Kincaid – medical practitioner
Adrienne Clarke AC – botanist, Chancellor of La Trobe University, Lieutenant Governor of Victoria

Politics and the law
Millie Peacock – first woman elected to the Parliament of Victoria
Nicola Roxon – Labor, federal Minister for Health, Attorney-General of Australia
Fiona Richardson – State Labor Minister for Northcote, Minister for women and Minister for the Prevention of Family Violence
Mary Wooldridge –  State Liberal member for Doncaster, Minister for Mental Health, Minister for Women's Affairs and Minister for Community Services, 2010–14
Judith Troeth – Liberal Senator for Victoria
Lara Giddings – Labor Premier of Tasmania 
Julia Riley – barrister, cellist

Sport
Alisa Camplin – aerial skier, Winter Olympiad gold medallist
Lydia Ierodiaconou – freestyle skier, Winter Olympiad gold medallist
Marina Cade – lightweight rower (world champion)
Rebecca Adam – sports administrator (President of the International Committee of Sports for the Deaf)
Elizabeth Patrick – rowing coxswain (national champion, world champion and a dual Olympian)
Meg Hutchins- AFLW footballer
Mimi Hill-AFLW
Daisy Bateman-AFLW
Other
Frances Gertrude Kumm (8 April 1886 – 4 June 1966) – women's activist and philanthropist
 Janet McCalman  – social historian at University of Melbourne
Jessie Vasey – founder, War Widows' Guild of Australia (also attended Lauriston Girls' School)
List of people on the postage stamps of Australia - Cate Blanchett, Lydia Ierodiaconou, Alisa Camplin

Controversy 
In September 2012 the school board sacked the then principal of 15 years, Rosa Storelli, leading to calls by Storelli plus many parents and Old Collegians for the board's dismissal. There were also protests outside the school by parents and students. The action by the board was made possible by changes to the school's constitution. This became a cautionary tale for other independent schools in Australia about the relationship between principals and the boards of those schools and the power-sharing relationships among the various stakeholders. By 2017 most members of that board had been replaced. Rosa Storelli is currently a senior academic at La Trobe University.

See also

 List of schools in Victoria
 List of high schools in Victoria

Notes
  Who's Who of girls' school rankings: 1.PLC Melbourne, 2.SCEGGS Darlinghurst, 3.MLC Melbourne, 4.PLC Sydney, 5.Melbourne Girls Grammar School, 6.Mac.Robertson Girls' High School, 7.North Sydney Girls High School, 8.Sydney Girls High School, 9.MLC Sydney, 10.University High School, Melbourne

References

Further reading
 Zainu'ddin, A. 1982. They Dreamt of a School: a Centenary History of the Methodist Ladies' College Kew, 1882-1982. Hyland House, Melbourne. .

External links
Official website

Girls' schools in Victoria (Australia)
Educational institutions established in 1882
Private schools in Melbourne
Former Methodist schools in Australia
Boarding schools in Victoria (Australia)
Junior School Heads Association of Australia Member Schools
Girls Sport Victoria
International Baccalaureate schools in Australia
1882 establishments in Australia
Alliance of Girls' Schools Australasia
Buildings and structures in the City of Boroondara